Gentiana austromontana, the Appalachian gentian, is a  tall flowering plant in the Gentianaceae family. It is native to the southern Appalachians of West Virginia, Virginia, North Carolina and Tennessee. Very similar to Gentiana clausa, it has paired, lanceolate leaves, usually on unbranched stalks, and blue or purple blooms which remain closed or nearly closed. It flowers from late August to October. It is thought that G. austromotana is the product of hybridization between G. clausa and G. decora as the Appalachian Gentian is found only in area where the former two are sympatric.

References

austromontana
Flora of the Appalachian Mountains
Flora of Virginia
Flora of West Virginia
Flora of North Carolina
Flora of Tennessee
Plants described in 1964
Flora without expected TNC conservation status